William H. Warren Jr. is an American psychologist who is currently the Chancellor's Professor at Brown University, focusing on perception and action, visual control of locomotion, and spatial navigation.

References

Brown University faculty
21st-century American psychologists
University of Connecticut alumni
Hampshire College alumni
Year of birth missing (living people)
Living people